This article details the Bradford Bulls rugby league football club's 2016 season. This was the Bulls' second season in the Championship, after narrowly missing out on promotion in the previous season's £1 Million Game which they lost 24-16 to the Wakefield Trinity Wildcats.

Season Review

July 2015

Bradford started their preparations for the 2016 season by announcing several departures from the club. The first of these were youngster Sam Bates who left to search for another club. Young hooker Nathan Conroy also moved to Championship side Dewsbury Rams whilst scrum half Adam Brook made his loan move to Keighley Cougars, a permanent one. Due to injuries prop Karl Davies retired from the sport and Dave Petersen signed for Sheffield Eagles without even playing a game for the Bulls.

August 2015

The first signing of the new season came in the form of fullback or halfback Oscar Thomas from RFL Championship side London Broncos on a two year deal.

September 2015

Veteran second-row Chev Walker announced his retirement and took up a position as assistant coach under James Lowes. Furthermore centre Adam Henry was released at the end of the 2015 season after he refused a new contract. Top point scorer Ryan Shaw also left the club after signing a deal with Super League side Hull Kingston Rovers.

October 2015

Algerian prop Samir Tahraoui signed for League 1 side Rochdale Hornets.

November 2015

Scrum half Harry Seijka was released from his contract at the end of the season following some poor performances. Centre Chris Ulugia also signed for RFL Championship side Batley Bulldogs on loan because he could not join permanently due to visa issues. Australian prop forward Mitch Clark followed in his fathers footsteps and joined the Bulls from Doncaster. Fullback Johnny Campbell signed a 2 year deal from Batley Bulldogs whilst prop forward Jonathan Walker and second row Kurt Haggerty both signed from Leigh Centurions.

December 2015

Due to the departure of Harry Seijka, injury prone fullback Jake Mullaney also left the Bulls by mutual consent. Following this Australian second row Matt Ryan who was brought in for the Super 8's was released without being offered a new contract. Prop forward Ben Kavanagh joined on a 2 year deal from Super League side Widnes Vikings.

Milestones

Round 1: Richie Mathers, Kris Welham, Ben Kavanagh, Kurt Haggerty and Johnny Walker made their debuts for the Bulls.
Round 1: Omari Caro scored his 2nd hat-trick for the Bulls.
Round 2: Mitch Clark and Rhys Lovegrove made their debuts for the Bulls.
Round 2: Matty Blythe made his 50th appearance for the Bulls.
Round 2: Lee Gaskell scored his 5th hat-trick for the Bulls.
Round 3: Oscar Thomas and Joe Lumb made their debuts for the Bulls.
Round 3: Kris Welham scored his 1st try and his 1st hat-trick for the Bulls.
CCR4: Lee Gaskell made his 50th appearance for the Bulls.
CCR4: Danny Addy scored his 25th try for the Bulls.
CCR4: Joe Lumb scored his 1st try for the Bulls.
Round 7: Ethan Ryan made his debut for the Bulls.
Round 7: Kurt Haggerty and Ethan Ryan scored their 1st try for the Bulls.
Round 8: Johnny Campbell made his debut for the Bulls.
Round 10: Ross Oakes made his debut for the Bulls.
Round 10: Kris Welham scored his 1st five-try haul, 1st four-try haul and 2nd hat-trick for the Bulls.
Round 10: Alex Mellor scored his 1st try for the Bulls.
Round 10: Omari Caro kicked his 1st goal for the Bulls.
Round 11: Danny Addy kicked his 100th goal and reached 300 points for the Bulls.
Round 11: Oscar Thomas and Mitch Clark scored their 1st try for the Bulls.
Round 13: Jacob Trueman made his debut for the Bulls.
Round 13: Oscar Thomas kicked his 1st goal for the Bulls.
Round 14: Oscar Thomas kicked his 1st drop goal for the Bulls.
Round 17: Kieren Moss and Lewis Charnock made their debuts for the Bulls.
Round 17: Lewis Charnock scored his 1st try for the Bulls.
Round 17: Danny Addy kicked his 1st drop goal for the Bulls.
Round 5: Johnny Campbell scored his 1st try for the Bulls.
Round 18: Kurt Haggerty kicked his 1st goal and 1st drop goal for the Bulls.
Round 19: Joe Philbin and Stuart Howarth made their debuts for the Bulls.
Round 19: Kieren Moss scored his 1st try for the Bulls.
Round 21: Dane Chisholm made his debut for the Bulls.
Round 21: Dane Chisholm scored his 1st try and kicked his 1st goal for the Bulls.
Round 21: Ethan Ryan scored his 1st hat-trick for the Bulls.
Round 21: Joe Philbin scored his 1st try for the Bulls.
Round 21: Lewis Charnock kicked his 1st goal for the Bulls.
Round 22: Adam O'Brien made his 100th appearance for the Bulls.
Round 22: Omari Caro scored his 1st five-try haul, 1st four-try haul and 3rd hat-trick for the Bulls.
Round 22: Omari Caro scored his 25th try and reached 100 points for the Bulls.
Championship Shield 1: Alex Mellor scored his 1st hat-trick for the Bulls.
Championship Shield 2: Danny Addy made his 150th appearance for the Bulls.
Championship Shield 3: Steve Crossley made his 50th appearance for the Bulls.
Championship Shield 3: Joe Keyes and James Bentley made their debuts for the Bulls.
Championship Shield 3: Kris Welham scored his 2nd five-try haul, 2nd four-try haul and 3rd hat-trick for the Bulls.
Championship Shield 3: Kris Welham scored his 25th try and reached 100 points for the Bulls.
Championship Shield 3: Jay Pitts scored his 1st hat-trick for the Bulls.
Championship Shield 3: Jay Pitts scored his 25th try and reached 100 points for the Bulls.
Championship Shield 3: Steve Crossley kicked his 1st goal for the Bulls.
Championship Shield 3: Joe Keyes scored his 1st try and kicked his 1st goal for the Bulls.
Championship Shield 4: Danny Addy reached 400 points for the Bulls.
Championship Shield 5: Ben Kavanagh scored his 1st try for the Bulls.
Championship Shield 5: Ethan Ryan scored his 2nd hat-trick for the Bulls.
Championship Shield 6: Josh Rickett and Liam Kirk made their debuts for the Bulls.
Championship Shield 6: Ross Oakes scored his 1st try for the Bulls.
Championship Shield 7: Adam Sidlow made his 100th appearance for the Bulls.
Championship Shield 7: Dale Ferguson made his 50th appearance for the Bulls.
Championship Shield 7: Ross Oakes scored his 1st hat-trick for the Bulls.
Championship Shield 7: Kieren Moss scored his 1st four-try haul and 1st hat-trick for the Bulls.
Championship Shield 7: Adam Sidlow kicked his 1st goal for the Bulls.
Championship Shield SF: Alex Mellor made his 50th appearance for the Bulls.
Championship Shield F: Adam O'Brien scored his 25th try and reached 100 points for the Bulls.
Championship Shield F: Dane Chisholm kicked his 1st drop goal for the Bulls.

Pre-season friendlies

Bulls score is first.

Player appearances
Friendly Games Only

 = Injured

 = Suspended

Table

Championship

C = Champions

Q = Qualified for the qualifiers

F = Unable to qualify for the qualifiers

Championship Shield

(Q) = Qualified for Play-offs

(S) = Secured spot in Championship

(R) = Relegated to League 1

Fixtures and results

Championship fixtures

Championship Shield

Player appearances
Championship Only

 = Injured

 = Suspended

Championship Shield Final
After finishing 1st in the Middle 8's and beating Dewsbury Rams in the Semi Final the Bulls qualified for the Championship Shield Final, Sheffield Eagles finished 4th in the table and beat Halifax in the Semi Final meaning that the two teams would meet in a play-off match to determine who would win the Championship Shield.

Challenge Cup

Player appearances
Challenge Cup Games only

Squad statistics

 Appearances and points include (Super League, Challenge Cup and Play-offs) as of 2 October 2016.

 = Injured
 = Suspended

Transfers in/out

In

Out

References

External links
Bradford Bulls Website
Bradford Bulls in T&A
Bradford Bulls on Sky Sports
Red,Black And Amber
BBC Sport-Rugby League 

Bradford Bulls seasons
2016 in rugby league by club
2016 in English rugby league